2677th Office of Strategic Services Regiment was a special infantry regiment that was seconded to the Office of Strategic Services as an operational armed force.

The regiment was organized on 15 July 1944 at Algiers, North Africa, sponsored by the U.S. Fifth Army. It was transferred to Caserta, Italy, where it was absorbed into the Office of Strategic Services Operational Group Command on 27 November 1944.

Honors

Campaign participation credit
Rome-Arno

References
of the Office of Strategic Services (OSS).

2677
Office of Strategic Services
Military units and formations established in 1944
Military units and formations disestablished in 1944